Hasanabad-e Yek (also Romanized as Ḩasanābād-e Yek; also known as Ḩasanābād) is a village in Pariz Rural District, Pariz District, Sirjan County, Kerman Province, Iran. At the 2006 census, its population was 18, in 4 families.

References 

Populated places in Sirjan County